The 1919 Chester-le-Street by-election was held on 13 November 1919.  The by-election was held due to the resignation of the incumbent Labour Member of Parliament (MP), John Wilkinson Taylor.  It was won by the Labour candidate Jack Lawson.

References

Chester-le-Street by-election
Chester-le-Street by-election
20th century in County Durham
Chester-le-Street by-elections
Chester-le-Street by-election